Gerov (masculine) or Gerova (feminine) is a Bulgarian surname. Notable people with the surname include:

Atanas Gerov (born 1945), Bulgarian footballer
Nayden Gerov (1823–1900), Bulgarian linguist, folklorist and writer

See also
Gerov Pass, mountain pass of Antarctica

Bulgarian-language surnames